Kazakhstan–Kyrgyzstan relations refers to the bilateral diplomatic relations between the Republic of Kazakhstan and the Kyrgyz Republic. Bilateral relationships between the countries, which share a border, are very strong and Kyrgyz and Kazakh are very close in terms of language, culture and religion. Kyrgyz-Kazakh relationships have always been at very high level and economic and other formal connections of two countries have been greeted with strong appreciation by both nations since the two share a lot in common.

Background

Kazakhstan and Kyrgyzstan were previously republics of the Soviet Union. They began their existence as autonomous republics within the Russian Soviet Federative Socialist Republic before 1936 when it was split into Soviet republics of Kazakhstan and Kirghizia.

During Joseph Stalin's rule, between 1930 to 1944, there were a number of ethnic groups such as the Kurds, Kalmyks, Chechens, Ingush or Balkars were sent to Kazakhstan or Kirghzia while nomadic Kazakhs were then deported from Kazakhstan.

While the cultures and traditions were maintained, the nationalism rose during the late 1980s under Mikhail Gorbachev's policies of glasnost and perestroika.

In March 1991, Kazakhstan and Kirghizia participated in a referendum in an attempt to preserve the Union as a renewed federation of sovereign states. During the failed coup that happened in Moscow in August 1991, Askar Akayev and Nursultan Nazarbayev condemned the communist hardliners.

Shortly after the events of the aborted coup, Kirghizia (renamed to Kyrgyzstan) and Kazakhstan declared their independence on August 31 and December 16 respectively before the final dissolution of the Soviet Union on December 26, 1991 when it ceased to exist. Relations between the two countries began in 1992.

Modern era
On April 26, 2007 the presidents of Kazakhstan and Kyrgyzstan signed an agreement to create an "International Supreme Council" between the two states. This historic event took place during an official visit of the Kazakh president to the Kyrgyzstan capital, Bishkek. Kazakhstan is extremely important to northern Kyrgyzstan. For some period in the mid-1990s, the virtual closure of Manas Airport at Bishkek made Kazakhstan's capital, Almaty, the principal point of entry to Kyrgyzstan. Kyrgyzstan's northwestern city of Talas receives nearly all of its services through the city of Taraz, across the border in Kazakhstan.

Kyrgyz election of 2017

During the 2017 Kyrgyz presidential election, on October 7, 2017, president Almazbek Atambayev accused Kazakhstan of sponsoring and backing one of the presidential candidates. He also accused Kazakhstan officials for being corrupt by looting the pensioners income. Upon his disapproval, on October 9, Atambayev's office also announced that he was cancelling his attendance at an upcoming CIS heads of state summit in the Russian city of Sochi. An event that would have required the Kyrgyz leader to meet president of Kazakhstan, Nursultan Nazarbayev. Due to the outlash, Kazakhstan border officials imposed a high-security regime at 6 pm on October 10, massively slowing down the passage of travelers and dispatched several truckloads of troops to the border and erected checkpoints. The troops are reportedly set to remain there until after Kyrgyzstan's elections are over. The Kyrgyz border service then replied with its own high-security regime two hours later.

In response to the allegations from Atambayev, the Kazakh Central Election Commission (OSK) declined an invitation to monitor the elections.

Relations under Sooronbay Jeenbekov
Relations under President Sooronbay Jeenbekov in the military sphere reached a new level, with Kazakh Defense Minister Saken Zhasuzakov becoming the first Kazakh military leader to visit Bishkek in July 2018.

Economic relations
Kazakhstan's direct investment in the Kyrgyz economy has been rapidly gaining pace since the early 2000s. Today Kazakhstan's economic presence is felt throughout northern Kyrgyzstan, from banks to small businesses, cars with Kazakh plates and numerous tourists. For the most, the Kyrgyz are welcoming these trends as both countries share a similar culture and traditions.
During the last five years Kazakhstan invested about 400 million dollars in Kyrgyzstan and is considered the largest investor. Thirty-three percent of the total Kyrgyzstan bank's equity belongs to Kazakh investors. There are about 2,000 enterprises functioning in Kyrgyzstan, and 500 belong to Kazakh entrepreneurs. Kazakh-Kyrgyz unification is in the economic interests of both countries. "I do not see any problem in unification with another country. In the future we should unite with this or another state, anyway. Unification with Kazakhstan will be a good accelerator for our economic development," said lawmaker Juraev.

In 2007, the President of Kazakhstan Nursultan Nazarbayev suggested the creation of a fund to facilitate Kyrgyzstan's economic development. However, the sides started implementing this project only in 2011. KKIF was created with a capital of US$100 million, fully funded by Kazakhstan. Its main objective is to render financial assistance to Kyrgyzstan's economy through implementation of the priority projects on its territory and effective development of small and medium businesses in Kyrgyzstan.

In 2014, Deputy Secretary General of the Turkic-speaking states Cooperation Council (Turk-ssCC) Adakhan Madumarov spoke about the Great Silk Way project that would bring tourism to both Kyrgyzstan and Kazakhstan.

In 2021, it was reported that the trade turnover between Kazakhstan and Kyrgyzstan reached $680 million USD - a growth of 9% over the first nine months of 2021.

References

 
Kyrgyzstan
Bilateral relations of Kyrgyzstan